Keelhaul is a four-piece progressive mathcore/sludge metal band from Cleveland, Ohio. The members are Aaron Dallison (bass and vocals), Dana Embrose (guitar), Will Scharf (drums), and Chris Smith (guitar and vocals).

The band toured Europe in April 2004 and subsequently went on a lengthy break. With no tours or new music recorded, Keelhaul entered the studio in December 2008 with producer Andrew Schneider to record their new album, Keelhaul's Triumphant Return to Obscurity. In the same month, the band resumed live activity with two shows, one in Philadelphia and the other in New York.  In 2009 they played support to Isis for the Wavering Radiant tour (which took in dates across Europe), filling the bill with Finnish band Circle.

Members
Chris Smith (Integrity, Terminal Lovers, False Hope) – guitar, vocals
Aaron Dallison (Escalation Anger, Ringworm, Abdullah, State of conviction) – bass, vocals
Dana Embrose (Groin, La Gritona, Suicide King, False Hope) – guitar
Will Scharf (Craw) – drums

Guest musicians
Bryant Clifford Meyer of Isis  and Red Sparowes appears on the song "Randall" from the Subject to Change Without Notice album.

Discography 
Keelhaul – (CD 1998, Cambodia Recordings)
Keelhaul – (CD 1999, Escape Artist Records)
Keelhaul – (LP 1999, Hydra Head Records) "Available as a picture disc"
Ornamental Iron – (LP 7" 2000, Hydra Head Records)
Keelhaul II – (CD 2001, Hydra Head Records)
Keelhaul II – (LP 2001, Escape Artist Records) "Available as a picture disc"
Anodyne – Keelhaul – (Split 7" LP 2002, Chainsaw Safety Records)
Subject To Change Without Notice – (CD 2003, Hydra Head Records)
Subject To Change Without Notice – (LP 2003, Escape Artist Records) Available as a picture disc.
You Waited Five Years For This? – (EP 7" 2009, Hydra Head Records)
Keelhaul's Triumphant Return to Obscurity – (2xLP 2009, Hydra Head Records)
Keelhaul's Triumphant Return to Obscurity – (CD 2009, Hydra Head Records)

External links 
Keelhaul @ MySpace
Interview with Apeshit
Another interview
Article "Hello Antwerp" in Cleveland Scene magazine

Heavy metal musical groups from Ohio
Musical groups from Cleveland
Metalcore musical groups from Ohio